Garrison is an unincorporated community and census-designated place in Lewis County, Kentucky, United States. Its population was 866 as of the 2010 census. Garrison has a post office with ZIP code 41141, which opened on February 26, 1886. The community is located along the Ohio River and Kentucky Route 8.

Geography

Demographics

Notable people
 Thomas Massie, congressman

References

Unincorporated communities in Lewis County, Kentucky
Unincorporated communities in Kentucky
Census-designated places in Lewis County, Kentucky
Census-designated places in Kentucky
Kentucky populated places on the Ohio River